Banana melon is an heirloom melon in the genus Cucumis originating from around 1880 in the United States.

Description
It weighs 5-10 pounds (2.2-3.6 kilograms) and measures 16-24 inches (40.6-70 centimeters) in length. Its name derives from its elongated, pointed shape and yellow rind, reminiscent of a banana, as well as its strong banana-like scent. Its soft flesh is salmon-colored and is said to have a very sweet flavor. It was a popular variety in the late 19th century, being noted by James J.H. Gregory as attracting much attention at agricultural fairs.

Availability
Seeds of the plant are available through several online sources.

See also
Muskmelon

References

Cucumis
Melons
Fruits originating in North America
Edible fruits